Gabriele Caliari (1568–1631) was an Italian of the late-Renaissance period. He was the eldest son of Paolo Veronese, was born in 1568, and died of the plague. After training in the workshop of his father, he seems to have painted few pictures of his own, and devoted himself chiefly to commerce, going on painting just for pleasure.

His work is included in the collection of the Art Institute of Chicago, the Rijksmuseum, Palazzo Ducale and the National Gallery of Art.

Sources

Penny, Nicholas,  National Gallery Catalogues (new series): The Sixteenth Century Italian Paintings, Volume II, Venice 1540-1600, 2008, National Gallery Publications Ltd,

References

External links

1568 births
1630 deaths
16th-century Italian painters
Italian male painters
17th-century Italian painters
Painters from Verona
Italian Renaissance painters